Rolan is an unincorporated community in Clinton County, Kentucky, United States.

Notes

Unincorporated communities in Clinton County, Kentucky
Unincorporated communities in Kentucky